Basking Ridge is an unincorporated community in New Jersey. It may also refer to:

 Basking Ridge Classical School (also known as Brick Academy)
 Basking Ridge station
 Presbyterian Church in Basking Ridge